David MacKenzie (born June 12, 1946) is a Canadian politician. He is a former member of the House of Commons of Canada, representing the riding of Oxford, Ontario as a Conservative from 2004 to 2023.

Career 
Born in London, Ontario, MacKenzie served with the Woodstock City Police from 1967 to 1997, and was Chief of Police from 1987 to 1997. In 1997, he became the General Manager of Roetin Industries Canada.

He first ran for parliament in the federal election of 1997 as a Progressive Conservative, losing to Liberal John Finlay by 1,575 votes. He ran again in the election of 2000, and lost to Finlay by roughly the same margin. The national Progressive Conservative Party had a weak organization in Ontario during this period, and that Mackenzie's vote totals were well above the party's provincial average and that in both 1997 and 2000, the right wing vote was split between the Progressive Conservatives and Reform who later became the Canadian Alliance.

In 2002, MacKenzie was the Bosnia and Herzegovina trainer for the National Democratic Institute in Washington, D.C.

The Progressive Conservatives merged with the Canadian Alliance as the Conservative Party of Canada in early 2004, and Mackenzie joined the new party.  Finlay did not run in the 2004 election, and MacKenzie defeated new Liberal candidate Murray Coulter by about 6,500 votes. After the election, he was named as his party's associate critic for National Defence. In the 2006 federal election, MacKenzie was re-elected to his Oxford seat, beating Liberal candidate Greig Mordue by a wide margin. With the Conservative Party of Canada forming a minority government, MacKenzie was selected as parliamentary secretary for the Ministry of Public Safety.

In December 2022, MacKenzie announced that he would retire as MP by the end of January 2023. On February 2023, Mackenzie sent a letter to  Anthony Rota, Speaker of the house,  Caroline Simard, Commissioner of  Election Canada, Robert Batherson, president of the Conservative Party, Kevin Price, chair of the party’s candidate selection committee, and Mike Crase, the Executive Director of the party, arguing that the party violated their own nomination rules by allegedly supporting Arpan Khanna to be the party nominee. Mackenzie believes that  Andrew Scheer violated House of Commons rules by parliamentary resources to record the endorsement video for Khanna. MacKenzie also questioned Khanna ties to the riding since Khanna was also the party candidate for Brampton North during the 2019 election. Mackenize's daughter, Deb Tait is also running for the party nomination.

Electoral record

				

Note: Conservative vote is compared to the total of the Canadian Alliance vote and Progressive Conservative vote in 2000 election.

	

Note: Canadian Alliance vote is compared to the Reform vote in 1997 election.

References

External links
 

1946 births
Conservative Party of Canada MPs
Living people
Members of the House of Commons of Canada from Ontario
People from Woodstock, Ontario
Politicians from London, Ontario
Canadian police chiefs
21st-century Canadian politicians